Hurricane Flossie was a powerful Pacific tropical cyclone that brought squally weather and light damage to Hawaii in August 2007. The sixth named storm, second hurricane, first and only major hurricane of the inactive 2007 Pacific hurricane season, Flossie originated from a tropical wave that emerged off Africa on July 21. After traversing the tropical Atlantic, the wave crossed Central America and entered the eastern Pacific on August 1. There, a favorable environment allowed it to become a tropical depression and a tropical storm shortly thereafter on August 8.

Tracking generally west-southwestward, the storm entered a stage of rapid deepening on August 10, despite forecasts of an only marginally favorable environment. On August 11, Flossie became a major hurricane, reaching its peak intensity with winds of 140 mph (220 km/h). With cooler sea surface temperatures and high wind shear in its path, the hurricane weakened steadily, deteriorating to a tropical depression by August 16. The storm's center became devoid of strong thunderstorms later that day, indicating Flossie no longer qualified as a tropical cyclone.

As a strong storm, Flossie prompted hurricane and tropical storm warnings for the Big Island of Hawaii. Residents were warned by emergency officials to prepare for over a foot of rainfall and wind gusts well within tropical storm force. However, impact was negligible; the peak wind gust on the Big Island of Hawaii reached , and rainfall totals remained below .

Meteorological history

The formation of Hurricane Flossie is attributed to a poorly defined tropical wave that emerged off the western coast of Africa and into the eastern Atlantic Ocean on July 21. Tracking westward, the disturbance remained disorganized and lacked a significant amount of convection – shower and thunderstorm activity – near its center. The wave crossed Central America and entered the eastern Pacific on August 1, where it was met with a much more favorable atmospheric environment for organization and intensification. A consolidated area of shower and thunderstorms developed near the center while the system was situated just south of the Gulf of Tehuantepec on August 2, though no further development occurred thereafter. Two days later, an increase in deep convection was observed on conventional satellite imagery, but like the first, no further organization occurred. On August 6, yet another burst of convection developed near the low-level center, and the National Hurricane Center (NHC) contemplated classifying the disturbance at that time, but yet another wane in shower and thunderstorm activity deferred this. The disturbance tracked westward through August 8, and following another deep burst of convection that persisted itself for an appreciable amount of time, had finally gathered enough organization to be classified as a tropical depression at 1800 UTC on August 8. Within an environment characterized by low vertical wind shear as a result of an anticyclone aloft and warm sea surface temperatures, Tropical Depression Six-E continued its organizational trend, and was declared a tropical storm – earning the name Flossie – six hours after formation.

Located on the southwestern periphery of a subtropical ridge situated over southwestern Mexico, Flossie tracked generally west-southwestward after formation while intensifying. Upper-level outflow began to expand in all quadrants of the cyclone and spiral bands became prominent around the center on August 9. An eyewall and associated mid-level eye-feature was observed on microwave imagery, but was obscured on conventional satellite imagery, that evening. Following a series of satellite intensity estimates and the presence of an eye on visible and infrared satellite imagery, Flossie was upgraded to a Category 1 on the Saffir–Simpson hurricane wind scale at 1200 UTC on August 10. Despite forecasts of an increasingly unfavorable environment as the cyclone moved towards the Hawaiian Islands, Flossie continued to intensify. The hurricane unexpectedly began a period of rapid deepening during the overnight hours of August 10, and by 0600 UTC on August 11, Flossie attained major hurricane intensity – a Category 3 hurricane – with a quickly falling barometric pressure. Early morning satellite images revealed a  eye with cloud tops cooler than  surrounding the feature. Further intensification ensued as the storm entered the Central Pacific Hurricane Center (CPHC)'s area of responsibility that morning, and Flossie was upgraded to a Category 4 hurricane by 1200 UTC. Two hours later, the cyclone attained its peak intensity with maximum sustained winds of 140 mph (220 km/h) and a minimum barometric pressure of 949 mb (hPa; 28.02 inHg), the strongest tropical cyclone of the 2007 Pacific hurricane season.

After peak intensity, Flossie was forecast to gradually weaken as wind shear increased. However, despite prediction of such, Flossie did not weaken at all and in fact remained a Category 4 hurricane for 36 continuous hours. In its discussion during the morning hours of August 13, the Central Pacific Hurricane Center stated that Flossie "was not willing to give up." By the pre-dawn hours of August 14, however, the cyclone began to feel the impacts of increasingly cool sea surface temperatures and higher southerly wind shear. While outflow in the northern semicircle of Flossie remained exceptional, outflow in the southern half of the circulation began to dissipate; additionally, the southern flank of the eyewall began to fall apart. Further passes through the eyewall of the storm depicted ever-decreasing surface winds and organization with Flossie, and the storm was downgraded once again, to a Category 2 hurricane, by 1200 UTC as it passed south of the Hawaiian Islands. Over  of vertical wind shear eroded the remainder of the storm's eyewall on August 15; as such, the Central Pacific Hurricane Center downgraded the cyclone to a tropical storm. Further weakening to tropical depression status occurred by 0600 UTC on August 16 as shower and thunderstorm activity over the center faded away. By 1200 UTC, a lone low-level swirl remained on satellite imagery, and the storm dissipated thereafter, while located southwest of the Hawaiian Islands.

Preparations and impact

Shortly after entering the Central Pacific Hurricane Center's area of responsibility, the organization issued a hurricane watch for the Big Island of Hawaii. Within a few days, as the hurricane tracked slightly further to the north and its wind radii expanded, a tropical storm warning was overlaid on the hurricane watch. Governor Linda Lingle declared a state of emergency for the Island of Hawaii in advance of the storm, where residents were advised to stock up on necessary supplies.

The Federal Emergency Management Agency (FEMA) dispatched 20 transportation, public works and health experts to the region. Emergency shelters were opened, though were used little. The threat of the storm led to the closure of schools, including the University of Hawaii at Hilo and Hawaii Community College, forcing an estimated 26,000 college students to remain home. Some libraries, parks, private schools, banks and other businesses were also closed. Non-essential state employees were advised to remain at home, and emergency workers were mobilized to quickly assist in the aftermath of the storm. In advance of the storm, many tourists canceled reservations.

Forecast heavy rains over the southeast-facing slopes of the Big Island failed to occur, as Flossie turned westward before low-level southeasterly winds had a chance to produce mountain-enhanced rainfall. However, north and northeast-facing slopes received minimal rainfall;  of rain was reported in the Hamakua, South Hilo, and Puna Districts. Elsewhere,  of precipitation fell at Maui, and  fell at the Koolau Range on Oahu, although no significant winds or flooding was reported. Wave action affected the southeast-facing shores, also with little impact. A large lava bench collapsed into the ocean on August 13, which may have been related to the hurricane's passage, or alternatively, a recent 5.4 magnitude earthquake.

See also

List of Hawaii hurricanes
Hurricane Jimena (2003)
Hurricane Felicia (2009)
Hurricane Iselle (2014)
Hurricane Hector (2018)
List of Category 4 Pacific hurricanes

References

External links

 NHC archive on Hurricane Flossie.
 CPHC archive on Hurricane Flossie.

2007 Pacific hurricane season
Category 4 Pacific hurricanes
Hurricanes in Hawaii
2007 in Hawaii
Flossie